Án Đô Vương Trịnh Bồng ( (25 August 1749 – 13 February 1791); reigned 1786–1787) was the last of the Trịnh lords. He succeeded Trịnh Khải, before southern Tây Sơn rebel leader and future emperor Nguyễn Huệ's 1788 final defeat of the northern Trịnh remnants.

Background
Trịnh Bồng is the son of Uy Nam Vương Trịnh Giang, born in 1740. His cousin was  Tĩnh Đô Vương Trịnh Sâm  and he was the uncle of Đoan Nam Vương Trịnh Khải. When Trịnh Sâm and his father took power, he was granted the title of Côn Quận Công (琨郡公).

References

1787 deaths
Year of birth unknown
Trịnh lords